The W. T. Bailey House is a historic house in Virginia, Minnesota, United States.  It was built around 1921 in Spanish Colonial Revival style for the founder of Bailey Lumber Mill, the city's second-largest lumber company.  The house was listed on the National Register of Historic Places in 1980 for its local significance in the themes of architecture, commerce, and industry.  It was nominated for its association with a prominent businessman in one of Virginia's primary industries, and for illustrating the correlation between "wealth and prominence in the mining and lumbering regions and large and architecturally distinctive residences".

See also
 National Register of Historic Places listings in St. Louis County, Minnesota

References

1921 establishments in Minnesota
Houses completed in 1921
Houses in St. Louis County, Minnesota
Houses on the National Register of Historic Places in Minnesota
National Register of Historic Places in St. Louis County, Minnesota
Spanish Colonial Revival architecture in the United States